{{Infobox person
| name               = Phyllida Lloyd
| honorific_suffix   = 
| image              = Phyllida Lloyd.jpg
| caption            = 
| birthname          = Phyllida Christian Lloyd
| birth_date         = 
| birth_place        = Nempnett Thrubwell, Somerset, England
| death_date         = 
| occupation         = Film and theatre director
| yearsactive        = 1997–present
| notable_works      = Mamma MiaThe Donmar Shakespeare Trilogy
| homepage           =

}}

Phyllida Christian Lloyd,  (born 17 June 1957) is an English film and Theatre director and producer.

Her theatre work includes directing productions at the Royal Court Theatre and Royal National Theatre, and opera director for Opera North and the Royal Opera House Covent Garden. Her adaptation of three Shakespeare plays (Julius Caesar, Henry IV and The Tempest) received acclaim from critics, with The Guardian calling it "one of the most important theatrical events of the past 20 years".

She is best known for directing Mamma Mia! (2008) and The Iron Lady (2011). Films she has directed have won 2 Academy Awards,  and have won and been nominated for numerous other awards. She has been nominated for a BAFTA Award, a European Film Award, 2 Tony Awards, and has won and been nominated for numerous awards.

Life and career
Lloyd was born and raised in Nempnett Thrubwell, Somerset, south of Bristol. After graduating from the Department of Drama and Theatre Arts at Birmingham University in 1979 (BA, English), she spent five years working in BBC Television Drama. In 1985 she was awarded an Arts Council of Great Britain bursary to be Trainee Director at the Wolsey Theatre, Ipswich. The following year she was appointed Associate Director at the Everyman Theatre, Cheltenham, then in 1989 Associate Director of the Bristol Old Vic, where her production of The Comedy of Errors was a success.

She moved on to the Royal Exchange Theatre, Manchester where she directed The Winter's Tale, The School for Scandal, Medea, and an acclaimed production of Death and the King's Horseman by Wole Soyinka. In 1991 she made her debut at the Royal Shakespeare Company with a well-received production of a little-known play by Thomas Shadwell, The Virtuoso. Although she followed this in 1992 with a successful production of the rarely seen Artists and Admirers by Alexander Ostrovsky, she has, as of 2007, never returned to the RSC.

Also in 1992 came her first commercial success: her Royal Court Theatre production of John Guare's Six Degrees of Separation transferred to the West End. In 1994 she made her debut at Royal National Theatre with a production of Pericles which divided the critics. There was general praise, however, for her productions of Hysteria by Terry Johnson at the Royal Court and Bertolt Brecht/Kurt Weill's The Threepenny Opera at the Donmar Warehouse.

By this time, Lloyd's work had come to the attention of Nicholas Payne, then running Opera North. For her debut as an opera director he steered her to what was, at least in the UK, an obscurity – L'Etoile by Chabrier. The production was a great success, setting Lloyd on a significant and award-winning career as an opera director. Productions since then include La Boheme, Gloriana, Cherubini's Medea, Albert Herring and Peter Grimes for Opera North; Dialogues of the Carmelites for English National Opera/Welsh National Opera; Verdi's Macbeth (for the Bastille Opera and the Royal Opera House Covent Garden); the premiere of Poul Ruders' opera The Handmaid's Tale (from the novel by Margaret Atwood); and a controversial Ring cycle for ENO. For Gloriana A Film She received an International Emmy and a FIPA d'Or . Her productions have won the Royal Philharmonic Society Award in 1991 (Gloriana) 2000 (The Carmelites) and 2007 (Peter Grimes).

In spite of the mixed reception accorded to her first production at the National Theatre, Lloyd nonetheless returned to direct productions of The Way of the World, Pericles, What the Butler Saw, The Prime of Miss Jean Brodie and The Duchess of Malfi, which were well received. She directed an award-winning production of Boston Marriage at London's Donmar Warehouse in 2001. Other recent work includes Friedrich Schiller's Mary Stuart newly adapted by poet Peter Oswald, which ran at the Donmar Warehouse, London, and was transferred to the Apollo Theatre, London, and then to the Broadway in spring 2009.

In 1999, Lloyd was offered the chance to direct the ABBA musical Mamma Mia!, which became a hit, not only in the West End and on Broadway, but worldwide. She directed the 2008 cinematic adaptation, which marked her feature debut. By the end of 2008, the film had been certified as the biggest grossing film at the UK box office ever. It was also certified as the UK's biggest-selling DVD. She was nominated as Best Director of a Play in the 2009 Tony Awards for her production of Mary Stuart.In 2013 Lloyd directed Cush Jumbo in a one women show about Josephine Baker at the Bush Theatre and subsequently at Joe's Pub in New York. Between 2012 and 2017 she directed the Donmar Warehouse Trilogy in London and New York. Harriet Walter played Brutus in Julius Caesar, the title role in Henry IV and Prospero in the Tempest in a single day. Susannah Clapp in The Guardian described the Trilogy as "one of the most important theatrical events of the last twenty years".

Lloyd directed The Iron Lady, a biopic of former British Prime Minister Margaret Thatcher, with Meryl Streep as Thatcher. The film entered production in January 2011 and was released in December of that year. Meryl Streep won the Academy Award for Best Actress for her performance as Thatcher.Catherine Shoard "Meryl Streep's Margaret Thatcher revealed in first still from The Iron Lady", The Guardian, 8 February 2011 Lloyd's film Herself written by Clare Dunne and Malcolm Campbell and starring Clare Dunne premiered at The 2020 Sundance Film Festival.

Filmography

Film

Honours
Oxford University named Phyllida Lloyd the Cameron Mackintosh Visiting Professor of Contemporary Theatre in 2006, the same year she was awarded an honorary degree by Bristol University. She was named one of the 101 most influential gay and lesbian people in Britain by The Independent'' newspaper in 2008; and in 2010 was ranked 22nd (dropping from 7th the previous year) in the same list. Lloyd was appointed Commander of the Order of the British Empire (CBE) in the 2010 New Year Honours. DLitt, Honorary Degree, 2009 Birmingham University.

Awards and nominations

Actions
On 16 August 2018, Lloyd condemned the destruction of the Said al-Mishal Cultural Centre in an Israeli airstrike on Gaza five days earlier.

See also 

 List of female film and television directors 
 List of lesbian filmmakers
 List of LGBT-related films directed by women
 Women's cinema

References

External links
 
 Interview with Lloyd and Margaret Atwood in The Guardian
 Playbill biography
 British Film Magazine – Song and Dance : Lloyd Directs Mamma Film

1957 births
Living people
English film directors
English theatre directors
English women film directors
British opera directors
Female opera directors
British lesbian artists
LGBT theatre directors
Women theatre directors
English LGBT people
Alumni of the University of Birmingham
Fellows of St Catherine's College, Oxford
WFTV Award winners
Commanders of the Order of the British Empire
21st-century British LGBT people